Luca Sangalli Fuentes (born 10 February 1995) is a Spanish professional footballer who plays for FC Cartagena as an attacking midfielder.

Club career
Born in San Sebastián, Gipuzkoa, Basque Country, Sangalli represented hometown club Real Sociedad as a youth, (appearing in the UEFA Youth League in 2013). He was promoted to the reserves on 23 June 2014, and made his senior debut on 5 October by coming on as a late substitute for Eneko Capilla in a 1–1 Segunda División B away draw against CD Toledo.

Sangalli scored his first senior goals on 3 October 2015, netting a brace in a 3–3 draw at SD Amorebieta. A regular starter for the B-side, he renewed his contract until 2019 on 26 May 2017, but missed out the first months of the 2017–18 season due to injuries.

On 14 August 2018, Sangalli was definitely promoted to the main squad in La Liga and extended his contract until 2020. He made his debut in the category on 31 August, starting in a 2–1 away loss against SD Eibar.

On 5 October 2018, Sangalli scored his first professional goal, netting his team's second in a 3–1 away win against Athletic Bilbao in the Basque derby. At the end of the month, the 23-year-old suffered a minor stroke. He returned to action the following January against RCD Espanyol, and was given an ovation as he left the pitch.

Sangalli spent the entire 2020–21 season sidelined due to a knee injury. In July 2021, he was demoted back to the B-team after they achieved promotion to Segunda División.

On 14 June 2022, Sangalli signed a one-year contract with FC Cartagena also in the second level.

International career
Uncapped by Spain at any level, Sangalli made his debut for the unofficial Basque side on 12 October 2018. He was one of several half-time substitutes as an experimental lineup won 4–2 against Venezuela at Mendizorrotza Stadium.

Personal life
Sangalli's elder brother Marco is also a footballer. A winger, he was also groomed at Real Sociedad. Both are of Italian ancestry. Their paternal grandfather emigrated from Italy to San Sebastian in the mid-20th century and Luca is able to speak some Italian.

Sangalli has a degree in Engineering. His maternal uncle is Miguel Fuentes, former Real Sociedad player and president.

Career statistics

Club

References

External links

1995 births
Living people
Footballers from San Sebastián
Spanish footballers
Spanish people of Italian descent
Association football midfielders
La Liga players
Segunda División B players
Real Sociedad B footballers
Real Sociedad footballers
FC Cartagena footballers
Basque Country international footballers
Sportspeople of Italian descent